Dame Elizabeth Nneka Anionwu  (born Elizabeth Mary Furlong; 2 July 1947) is a British nurse, health care administrator, lecturer, and Emeritus Professor of Nursing at University of West London.

In 1979, Anionwu became the United Kingdom's first sickle-cell and thalassemia nurse specialist, helping establish the Brent Sickle Cell and Thalassaemia Counselling centre with consultant haematologist Milica Brozovic. In 1998, by then a Professor of Nursing, Anionwu created the Mary Seacole Centre for Nursing Practice at the University of West London. She holds the Order of Merit, was appointed a Dame Commander of the Order of the British Empire and is a Fellow of the Royal College of Nursing (RCN). She retired in 2007, and in 2016 she published her memoirs, Mixed Blessings from a Cambridge Union.

Early life
Elizabeth Nneka Anionwu was born Elizabeth Mary Furlong in Birmingham, England, to an Irish mother and a Nigerian father. Her mother, Mary Maureen Furlong, was in her second year studying classics at Newnham College, Cambridge University.  Her father, Lawrence Odiatu Victor Anionwu, was studying law at Cambridge University.

Her upbringing had been heavily affected by moving between institutions and family. She spent just over two years living with her mother, a relationship that ended when her stepfather, who did not accept her and drank heavily, started to physically abuse her. She was placed in a catholic children's home where she was cared for by nuns, including several years in the Nazareth House convent in Birmingham.

Often harshly punished and humiliated for wetting the bed, she remembers being made to stand with a urine-soaked sheet over her head as a punishment for wetting the bed. In the book she recalls, that later in life when working as a health visitor, "I made sure to keep up-to-date with more humane treatments for bedwetting". Nonetheless, she grieved leaving the convent to go and live with her mother. Every period of relative stability in childhood ended in sudden collapse. Following an unsettled childhood she qualified as a nurse, then health visitor. Shortly before her 25th birthday she suddenly found her father: barrister and former Nigerian Ambassador to Italy and the Vatican, Lawrence Anionwu. She was to visit Nigeria frequently and later changed her surname to Anionwu.

Family
Anionwu has credited her father, Lawrence Anionwu, a barrister and diplomat, as the first person to provide her with career advice. Anionwu has one child, her daughter Azuka Oforka, an actress (in the BBC One medical drama series Casualty).

Career
Anionwu began her nursing career inspired by a nun who cared for her eczema. At the age of 16, she left school with seven O-levels and started to work as a school nurse assistant in Wolverhampton. She continued with education to become a nurse, health visitor, and tutor. She travelled to the United States to study counselling for sickle-cell and thalassemia centres as courses were not then available in the UK. In 1979 she worked with Dr Milica Brozovic to create the first UK sickle-cell and thalassemia counselling centre in London Borough of Brent. This was the first of over 30 centres in the UK using the Brent Centre as a model.

In 1990 she was a lecturer at the Institute of Child Health, University College London, later promoted to senior lecturer. With the help of Professor Marcus Pembrey, Anionwu taught a course at University College London for National Health Service (NHS) staff members who worked with communities affected or at risk of sickle-cell disease, cystic fibrosis, Tay–Sachs disease and thalassaemia.

Anionwu was appointed dean of the School of Adult Nursing Studies and Professor of Nursing at University of West London. Here she created the Mary Seacole Centre for Nursing Practice at the University of West London, retiring in 2007. In 2001, Anionwu, along with Professor Atkin, wrote The Politics of Sickle Cell and Thalassemia. In 2005, she wrote, A Short History of Mary Seacole. In 2003 she became a Trustee and subsequently vice-chairperson of the Mary Seacole Memorial Statue Appeal. Following the unveiling of the statue at St Thomas' Hospital in June 2016 she was appointed a Life Patron of the Mary Seacole Trust.

Anionwu is also a Patron of other charities:
 Sickle Cell Society
 Nigerian Nurses Charitable Association UK
 Vice President of Unite/Community Practitioners and Health Visitors Association
 Honorary Advisor to England's Chief Nursing Officer's Black & Minority Ethnic Strategic Advisory Group

Publications
Throughout the course of her career, Anionwu has published many pieces of work. In 2016, she published a memoir called Mixed Blessing from a Cambridge Union.

Anionwu has published works related to her field of work and study in many journals. She has written informative pamphlets for family members of sickle-cell patients, nurses who care for sickle-cell patients, and information for the general population.

Selected writings
 1977: "Self Help in Sickle Cell Anaemia".  World Medicine 12(25): 86–91.
 1978: "Sickle Cell Menace in the Blood". Nursing Mirror; 147(3): 16–19.
 1981: (with A. Beattie) "Learning to cope with Sickle Cell Disease – A Parent's Experience". Nursing Times; 77(28): 1214–19.
 1982: "Sickle Cell Disease". Health Visitor; 55: 336–341.
 1983: "Sickle Cell Disease: Screening & counseling in the antenatal and neonatal period". Midwife, Health Visitor & Community Nurse; 19: 402–406 (Part 1, October).
 1984: (with M. Brozovic) "Sickle cell disease in Britain". Journal of Clinical Pathology; 37: 1321–1326.
 1985: "Pain Perception in Sickle Cell Crisis". In: A. Baughan (ed.), Pain in Sickle Cell Disease. Sickle Cell Society, 1985.
 1986: (with H. Jibril) Sickle Cell Disease – A guide for families. London: Collins.
 1988: (with N. Patel, G. Kanji, H. Renges, M. Brozovic) "Counseling for Prenatal Diagnosis of Sickle Cell Disease and Beta Thalassemia Major. A four year experience". Journal of Medical Genetics; 25:769–72.
 1989: (with O. O. Akinyanju) "Training of counsellors on sickle cell disorders in Africa". The Lancet; 1: 653–654.
 1991: "Teaching Community Genetics". Nursing; 4(42): 37–38.
 1992: "Sickle Cell Disorders in Schoolchildren". Health Visitor; 65(4): 120–122.
 1993: "Genetics – A Philosophy of Perfection?" In: Beattie A., M. Gott, L. Jones & M. Sidell (eds), Reader in Health & Well Being. Macmillan/Open University Press, 1993: 76–83.
 1994: "Women and sickle cell disorders". In: Wilson, M. (ed.), The Black Women's Health Book, London: Virago Press, 1994, pp. 6174.
 1996: (with L. Laird, C. Dezateux) "Neonatal screening for sickle cell disorders: what about the carrier infants?" British Medical Journal, 313:407–411.
 1997: "Haemoglobinopathies". Practice Nurse 25 April:13;374–379. 
 1998: (with J. Chapple) "Health Needs Assessment: Genetic Services". Chapter 12, in: S. Rawaf & V. Bahl (eds), Assessing Health Needs of People from Minority Ethnic Groups. London: Royal College of Physicians, 1998, pp. 169–190.
 1999: "In the Shadow of the Lamp. The story of the Crimea’s Unsung Nursing Heroine". Primary Nursing Care, November, pp. 21–22.
 2000: (with D. Sookhoo, J. Adams) "In the Melting Pot". Nursing Times 96:29, pp. 40–41.
 2001: "Screening and Genetic Counseling in Sickle Cell Disease". Archives of Ibadan Medicine, Vol. 2, No. 2, pp. 54–56.
 2002: "Leg ulcers and sickle cell disorders". Nursing Times, Vol. 98, No. 25, pp. 56–57.
 2003: "It's time for a statue of Mary Seacole". Nursing Times 99(32): 17 (12 August). 
 2004: "Nursing input is crucial to genetics policy". Nursing Times 100 (25): 18. (22 June).
 2005: A short history of Mary Seacole: a resource for nurses and students. London: Royal College of Nursing.
 2006: (with E. Oteng-Ntim, C. Cottee, S. Bewley) "Sickle Cell Disease in Pregnancy". Current Obstetrics and Gynaecology. 16: 353–360.
 2007: "Making my mark". Nurse Researcher 14 (2): 84–86.
 2008: "Sickle cell disease: quality of care needs to improve within the NHS". Diversity in Health and Social Care. 15 December, 5:237–9.
 2009: "Sickle Cell Disease in on the increase and nurses need to be aware". Nursing & Midwifery Council News, Issue 28/May, p. 12.
 2012: "Mary Seacole: nursing care in many lands". British Journal of Healthcare Assistants, May, Vol. 6, No. 5.
 2013: "Scotching three myths about Mary Seacole". British Journal of Healthcare Assistants. October, Vol. 7, No. 10.
 2014: (with A. Leary) "Modeling the Complex Activity of Sickle Cell and Thalassemia Specialist Nurses in England". Clinical Nurse Specialist,  September/October, Vol. 28, Issue 5, pp. 277–282.
 2014: (with C. Staring-Derks, J. Staring) "Mary Seacole: Global Nurse Extraordinaire". Journal of Advanced Nursing, Volume 71, Issue 3, pp. 475–712.

Awards
Anionwu was appointed Commander of the Order of the British Empire (CBE) in the 2001 Birthday Honours for her services to nursing. In 2004 she was awarded the Fellowship of the Royal College of Nursing (FRCN) for developing the sickle-cell and thalassemia counselling centre.  In 2007, following her retirement, she was appointed Emeritus Professor for Nursing at the University of West London.

In 2010 she was inducted into the Nursing Times Nursing Hall of Fame for the dedication to the Development of Nurse-led Services. She also received the 2015 Lifetime Achievement Award on Divas of Colour. Anionwu was appointed Dame Commander of the Order of the British Empire (DBE) in the 2017 New Year Honours for services to nursing and the Mary Seacole Statue Appeal. Anionwu was awarded a Fellowship of the Queen's Nursing Institute in October 2017.

In 2019, in recognition of Anionwu's major contribution to nursing, research and campaigning, the University of St Andrews conferred on her the degree of Doctor of Science, honoris causa. Also in 2019 she was awarded an honorary doctorate from Birmingham City University, in recognition of her major contribution to the nursing profession.

At the Pride of Britain Awards in October 2019, Anionwu received the Lifetime Achievement Award, "in recognition of her passion for nursing and dedication to reducing health inequalities", the presentation being made Janet Jackson.

On 31 May 2020 Anionwu was the subject of an episode of Desert Island Discs on BBC Radio 4. She was on the list of the BBC's 100 Women (BBC) announced later that year on 23 November.

She was made a member of the Order of Merit in 2022.

References

External links 

 
"Professor Dame Elizabeth Nneka Anionwu"  @ NHS Curator Archive
"Professor Dame Elizabeth Nneka Anionwu", Women in the Humanities (WiH), Oxford University.
@EAnionwu Twitter
Chiara Rambaidi, "A British nurse who became the UK’s first sickle cell specialist at 73 years old", Powell & Barns Media, 27 August 2020.
"In conversation with…Dame Elizabeth Anionwu", RCN Bulletin, 18 June 2020.
"Five Questions: Professor Dame Elizabeth Anionwu". People's History of the NHS.
Amadeus Harte, "'You can do much more than this': the people who have inspired care leavers", The Guardian, 12 March 2020.
  Alex Mistlin, "Elizabeth Anionwu: the ‘cool, black and exceptional’ woman who fought to make the NHS fairer", The Guardian, 10 December 2020.

Academics of the University of West London
Academics of the London School of Hygiene & Tropical Medicine
English nurses
Nigerian recipients of British titles
Dames Commander of the Order of the British Empire
Members of the Order of Merit
Living people
Fellows of the Royal College of Nursing
1947 births
English people of Nigerian descent
English people of Irish descent
Black British women academics
People from Birmingham, West Midlands
BBC 100 Women
Black British people in health professions
British nurses